SORCE is a browser-based tool which contains a suite of applications that can be used as an Intranet, Extranet or Enterprise portal. SORCE is installed on a Microsoft Windows Server (IIS) and a Microsoft Server database platform. It is written using the asp.NET framework.

Features
SORCE’s architecture is that of a core framework with a number of applications. The framework contains its own application development environment for the creation and modification of these applications. The applications require the core software to provide basic functionality and cannot be installed as standalone tools. Integration is also a key feature, the SORCE Intranet offering can integrate with internal software and systems such as SAP, customer relationship management systems, or even phone systems.

The core functionality consists of:

 Content Management and Administration
 Security and Authentication
 Intranet wide Search
 Integration

Standard applications include:

Document Management
Contacts Directory
Expenses Management
Event Manager
HR Management

Organisations using SORCE Intranet

Organisations using SORCE cover a wide range of sectors from finance to manufacturing, not for profit organisations such as charities and housing associations as well as local authorities and other public sector agencies. Examples include:

Manchester United
Virgin
Travelodge
NEXT

Awards
SORCE Intranet was voted "Document Management/Collaboration Product" and "Intranet Design Software" for the 2009 Intranet Journal product of the year awards. This was the second year of winning the "Intranet Design Software" award.
SORCE have also been listed on the 2009–2010 EContent magazines EContent 100 A "list of the 100 companies that matter most in the digital content industry"

References

Web applications
Content management systems
Administrative software